Psychotherapy Research is a bimonthly peer-reviewed academic journal covering research on all aspects of psychotherapy. It is published by Routledge on behalf of the Society for Psychotherapy Research. The founding team of editors consisted of David Alan Shapiro (Leeds University), Hans Strupp, and Klaus Grawe. The current editors are Christoph Flückiger (University of Zürich) and Jeffrey A. Hayes (Penn State University).

Abstracting and indexing
The journal is abstracted and indexed in MEDLINE, Scopus, Social Sciences Citation Index, Psychological Abstracts, PsycINFO, and PsycLIT. According to the Journal Citation Reports, the journal has a 2019 impact factor of 2.984.

See also
 List of psychotherapy journals

References

External links
 

Psychotherapy journals
Publications established in 1990
Bimonthly journals
Routledge academic journals
English-language journals